Open Medicine is a peer-reviewed open access medical journal. It is published by De Gruyter and the editor-in-chief is Prof. Eric J.G. Sijbrands (Erasmus MC, Rotterdam). It was established in 2006 as the Central European Journal of Medicine, co-published by Versita and Springer Science+Business Media. In 2014 the journal was moved to De Gruyter. It obtained its current name in 2015 when it became open access.

Abstracting and indexing 
The journal is abstracted and indexed in:

According to the Journal Citation Reports, the journal has a 2018 impact factor of 1.221.

References

External links 
 

General medical journals
Publications established in 2006
English-language journals
Creative Commons Attribution-licensed journals
De Gruyter academic journals
Bimonthly journals